Jarrod Penright is a former college, NFL, and AFL football player. He played college football for Texas A&M and had a short career in the NFL prior to joining the AFL. He played for both the Indiana Firebirds and the Tampa Bay Storm in the AFL.

Early life
Penright attended Eisenhower High School where he was selected as the Defensive Player of the Year by the Houston Chronicle after accumulating 66 solo tackles and 12 quarterback sacks.

College
During his time at Texas A&M, he was part of the Wrecking Crew defensive team. He started his first game with the Aggies in 2000. He started every game in 2001 and led the team in sacks and tackles for a loss. He was involved in a car accident during the summer of 2002 which caused him to miss practice due to headaches.

His junior year, he was first-team all-conference for the Big 12. That season, he totaled 66 tackles, 19 tackles for a loss, and 10.5 sacks. His senior year, he was selected to the second-team all-conference for the Big 12. He posted 50 tackles, 15.5 tackles for a loss, and 9.5 sacks.

NFL
Penright went undrafted in the 2003 NFL Draft. In August 2003, the Minnesota Vikings signed him as a free agent on the same day that they waived Jeff Kostrewa. He was later released during roster cuts on August 25, 2003.

AFL
Penright joined the AFL in 2004 and played with the Indiana Firebirds. During the 2004 season, he had 114 yards on 25 carries and scored 3 touchdowns. He also had 13.5 tackles, 8 solo tackles, 1 forced fumble, and 1 fumble recovery.

In 2005, he signed a multi-year contract with the team to play linebacker and fullback. In 2005, he appeared in 6 games and had 20 carries for 53 yards and 4 touchdowns. He finished the season ranked 2nd on the team in yards per carry with 2.7. He also played linebacker for the team in 2005 where he recorded 3 solo tackles, 3 assisted tackles, and 1 blocked kick.

References

External links
 Jarrod Penright Fanbase Profile

Texas A&M University alumni
Tampa Bay Storm players
1980 births
Living people